Ramanujan Prize may refer to:

 SASTRA Ramanujan Prize awarded by the Shanmugha Arts, Science, Technology and Research Academy
 ICTP Ramanujan Prize, awarded by the International Centre for Theoretical Physics
 Srinivasa Ramanujan Medal
 A K Ramanujan Award, for translators see Katha_Books#Katha_Awards

See also
 Ramanujan (disambiguation)